Ibrahima Thomas (born 7 February 1987) is a Senegalese professional basketball player for US Monastir. He previously also played for the Senegal national basketball team. Thomas played college basketball for Oklahoma State before transferring to Cincinnati as a sophomore.

Professional career
On 24 December 2021, Thomas signed with Jordanian club Orthodox for the 2021–22 season of the Premier League.

On 24 September 2022, he joined Ohud Medina of the Saudi Premier League.

On 27 February 2023, Thomas was announced by US Monastir, the defending champions of the BAL, for the 2023 season.

National team career
Thomas has played for the Senegalese national basketball team. He was a member of the teams at AfroBasket 2013 and AfroBasket 2015 and the 2014 FIBA Basketball World Cup.

BAL career statistics

|-
| style="text-align:left;"|2021
| style="text-align:left;"|AS Police
| 3 || 3 || 32.4 || .381 || .286 || .444 || style="background:#cfecec;"| 12.0* || 3.3 || 1.7 || .7 || 13.3
|-
|- class="sortbottom"
| style="text-align:center;" colspan="2"|Career
| 3 || 3 || 32.4 || .381 || .286 || .444 || 12.0 || 3.3 || 1.7 || .7 || 13.3

References

External links
 Eurobasket.com profile
 RealGM profile

1987 births
AS Police basketball players
Living people
Cáceres Ciudad del Baloncesto players
Centers (basketball)
Cincinnati Bearcats men's basketball players
Oklahoma State Cowboys basketball players
Senegalese men's basketball players
Senegalese expatriate basketball people in Bahrain
Senegalese expatriate basketball people in Iran
Senegalese expatriate basketball people in Japan
Senegalese expatriate basketball people in Jordan
Senegalese expatriate basketball people in Lebanon
Senegalese expatriate basketball people in Libya
Senegalese expatriate basketball people in Qatar
Senegalese expatriate basketball people in Saudi Arabia
Senegalese expatriate basketball people in Spain
Senegalese expatriate basketball people in Tunisia
Senegalese expatriate basketball people in the United States
Texas Legends players
2014 FIBA Basketball World Cup players

US Monastir basketball players
Al Sadd Doha basketball players
Ohud Medina basketball players
Azad University Tehran BC players
Al-Muharraq SC basketball players
Al-Ittihad Jeddah basketball players
Saitama Broncos players
Hoops Club players
Orthodox Club players